Advocates for Opioid Recovery (AOR) is an advocacy group founded by Former Rep. Patrick J. Kennedy, former House Speaker Newt Gingrich and Van Jones, a former domestic policy adviser to former United States President Barack Obama.

Activities
The group's activities have included publishing op-eds and providing interviews to push for opioid addiction treatment.

As paid advisers for the group, Kennedy, Gingrich and Van Jones have conducted a number of joint interviews with various media outlets, ranging from Fox News to the New Yorker.

The group's social media campaign "#LetsTrumpAddiction" is aimed at encouraging President Trump to reaffirm his commitment to ending the opioid crisis.

Positions
Gingrich, Kennedy and Jones have called for Congress to fix the national shortage of physicians who are certified to prescribe opioid recovery medication, as well as the laws that restrict the number of addicted patients a physician can treat in a year. They have called for insurance companies to start covering treatments with medication in the same manner as they cover treatments for any other chronic disease. Additionally, they have called for drug courts to encourage treatment with medication as part of sentencing.

Funding
According to STAT News, Gingrich stated he had no idea who was funding the organization. According to USA Today, the organization is funded by a grant from Braeburn Pharmaceuticals.

References

External links 
 Official Website

Addiction organizations in the United States
Drug policy organizations based in the United States
Healthcare reform advocacy groups in the United States
Health policy in the United States
Pharmaceuticals policy